Heteroclinus macrophthalmus, the large-eye weedfish, is a species of clinid native to Indian Ocean waters around southern Australia where it prefers beds of sea-grass and algal reefs down to a depth of about .  This species can reach a maximum length of  TL.

References

macrophthalmus
Fish described in 1976